The German Free-minded Party (DFP) or German Radical Party was a short-lived liberal party in the German Empire, founded on 5 March 1884 as a result of the merger of the German Progress Party and the Liberal Union, an 1880 split-off of the National Liberal Party.

Policies 
The economists Ludwig Bamberger and Georg von Siemens as well as the liberal politician Eugen Richter were among the prime movers of the merger in the view of the forthcoming accession of the considered liberal Crown Prince Frederick William to the throne (which took place only in 1888). Richter aspired to build up a strong united liberal force in the Reichstag parliament, similar to the British Liberal Party under William Ewart Gladstone. The Free-minded Party supported the expansion of parliamentarism in the German constitutional monarchy, separation of church and state and Jewish emancipation.

Under party chairman Franz August Schenk von Stauffenberg along with his deputies Albert Hänel and Rudolf Virchow, the Free-minded Party received disappointing 17.6% of the votes in the 1884 federal election, representing a drop of 3.6% from the combined parties' results in the previous 1881 federal election. The main beneficiaries of this defection were the Conservative forces, supporting the protectionist, colonialist and anti-socialist policies of Chancellor Otto von Bismarck. In the 1887 federal election, the party again lost half of their seats, dropping down to 32 Reichstag mandates. Though urged by his wife Princess Royal Victoria, Crown Prince Frederick William did not dare to meet trouble with Bismarck by openly taking the party's side. His early death in 1888 and the accession of his son William II terminated all liberal hopes.

During the decay, the differences between progressives and centre-right liberals became inconsolable. Upon Bismarck's demission in 1890, the party members lost their common adversary. In 1893, the Free-minded Party split in conflict over Chancellor Leo von Caprivi's policies into the Free-minded People's Party and the Free-minded Union. A re-union took place in 1910, when both further weakened liberal parties merged with the German People's Party to form the Progressive People's Party.

Notable members 

 Ludwig Bamberger
 Theodor Barth
 Max von Forckenbeck
 Albert Hänel
 Max Hirsch
 Albert Kalthoff
 Ludwig Loewe
 Theodor Mommsen
 Eugen Richter
 Heinrich Edwin Rickert 
 Georg von Siemens
 Rudolf Virchow

See also
 Contributions to liberal theory
 Liberal democracy
 Liberalism
 Liberalism in Germany
 Liberalism worldwide
 List of liberal parties

References 

Germany 1884
Defunct political parties in Germany
Political parties established in 1884
Liberal parties in Germany
Radical parties
Political parties of the German Empire
Political parties disestablished in 1893
1884 establishments in Germany